Giuliano Marinho dos Santos, better known simply as Giuliano (born August 13, 1977 in Cruzeiro do Sul, Paraná) is a Brazilian professional football player last on contract with Montenegrin First League club FK Budućnost Podgorica.

Honours
Ituano
Campeonato Paulista: 2002

External links
 
 
 Stats from Montenegro at FSCG.co.me

Living people
1977 births
Brazilian emigrants to Poland
Brazilian footballers
Brazilian expatriate footballers
Ituano FC players
Comercial Futebol Clube (Ribeirão Preto) players
Associação Ferroviária de Esportes players
Esporte Clube XV de Novembro (Piracicaba) players
CR Vasco da Gama players
Paraná Clube players
Legia Warsaw players
Widzew Łódź players
Pogoń Szczecin players
Ekstraklasa players
Expatriate footballers in Poland
Panionios F.C. players
Panachaiki F.C. players
Brazilian expatriate sportspeople in Poland
Niki Volos F.C. players
Super League Greece players
Expatriate footballers in Greece
FK Budućnost Podgorica players
Expatriate footballers in Montenegro
Association football midfielders
Association football defenders